Lau Mung King is a Hongkonger footballer who plays as a midfielder. She has been a member of the Hong Kong women's national team.

International career 
Lau Mung King capped for Hong Kong at senior level during two AFC Women's Olympic Qualifying Tournaments (2012 and 2016) and two AFC Women's Asian Cup qualifications (2014 and 2018).

See also 
 List of Hong Kong women's international footballers

References

External links

Living people
Hong Kong women's footballers
Women's association football midfielders
Hong Kong women's international footballers
Footballers at the 2014 Asian Games
Asian Games competitors for Hong Kong
Year of birth missing (living people)